After several years of low key tournaments with the major nations absent, the 2007 Championship  was the largest ever with 16 teams competing in two Pools, including four Six Nations countries, plus Spain keen to do well having been replaced Italy in that competition. England and France were as usual represented by "A" teams, and Wales sent a development squad, but other countries appeared to be at full-strength.

Pool B was also of interest with four nations making their 15-a-side debuts - Finland, Luxembourg, Romania, and Serbia.

"Top 8" (In Madrid, Spain)

Pool 1

Pool 2

7th/8th place

5th/6th place

3rd/4th place

Final

Pool B (Belgium)

Pool 1

Pool 2

7th/8th place

5th/6th place

3rd/4th place

Final

See also
Women's international rugby union

References

External links
FIRA website

2007
2007 rugby union tournaments for national teams
International women's rugby union competitions hosted by Spain
International rugby union competitions hosted by Belgium
2006–07 in Belgian rugby union
2007 in Spanish women's sport
2006–07 in European women's rugby union
2006–07 in Spanish rugby union